Jamie Schaffer (born 24 March 1965) is a Canadian rower. He competed in the men's eight event at the 1988 Summer Olympics.

References

External links
 

1965 births
Living people
Canadian male rowers
Olympic rowers of Canada
Rowers at the 1988 Summer Olympics
Sportspeople from St. John's, Newfoundland and Labrador
Pan American Games medalists in rowing
Pan American Games silver medalists for Canada
Rowers at the 1987 Pan American Games